John L. Dahl (1879May 29, 1943) was an American lawyer and progressive Republican politician.  He was the 48th speaker of the Wisconsin State Assembly (1923–1925) and represented Barron County.

Biography
John Dahl was born in the town of Unity, Trempealeau County, Wisconsin, in 1879, the eldest of nine children born to Norwegian American immigrant parents. He was educated in public schools and then attended the River Falls Normal School.  He went on to earn his bachelor's degree from the University of Wisconsin.  He worked as a school principal and was city superintendent of schools.  He established a farm, where he raised Holstein cattle and grew potatoes.

He later returned to school and graduated from the Hamilton College of Law in Chicago.  He was admitted to the bar in 1916 and started a legal partnership, Dahl & Gannon, at Rice Lake, Wisconsin.

He served as county food administrator when the United States Food Administration was active, and, in 1918, was elected district attorney of Barron County, Wisconsin.  He was a delegate to the 1920 Republican National Convention and was elected to the Wisconsin State Assembly that Fall.  He was re-elected in 1922 and was chosen as speaker for the 1923–1924 session.  His most notable achievement in the Legislature was passing additional funding for public schools.

After the 1924 legislative session, Dahl was accused of embezzling money from an acquaintance—Andrew Haugsboe.  He fled the state and was arrested in Chicago in the Fall of 1925.  In order to avoid prosecution, Dahl signed a note pledging to repay the funds.  The money had not been repaid by the time Haugsboe died, and the administrator of his estate sued to collect.  The issue was still pending at the time of Dahl's death in 1943.

Dahl died at the home of his sisters on May 29, 1943.

Electoral history

| colspan="6" style="text-align:center;background-color: #e9e9e9;"| General Election, November 2, 1920

References

External links
 

1879 births
1943 deaths
People from Trempealeau County, Wisconsin
People from Barron County, Wisconsin
District attorneys in Wisconsin
Speakers of the Wisconsin State Assembly
Republican Party members of the Wisconsin State Assembly
Burials in Wisconsin
20th-century American politicians